The Iceland men's national water polo team (Icelandic: Islenska karlalandsliðað í vatnsleikjum)  is the representative for Iceland in international men's water polo.

Results

Olympic Games
1936 — 15th place

References

Water polo
Men's national water polo teams
National water polo teams in Europe
National water polo teams by country
 
Men's sport in Iceland